Charles Duryee Traphagen (July 13, 1862 - March 25, 1947) was the publisher of the Nebraska State Journal in Lincoln, Nebraska.

Biography

Charles Duryee Traphagen was born in Haverstraw, New York on July 13, 1862, to Peter P. Traphagen (1818-1862) and Catherine Van Wagenen Duryea (1818-1862). He had a son, Charles Vance Traphagen. He served on the board of the Nebraska State Journal from 1905 to 1907.

He died on March 25, 1947.

References

External links

1862 births
1947 deaths